Neusatz District ( or ; ; ;) was one of five administrative districts of the Voivodeship of Serbia and Banat of Temeschwar (a crown land within Austrian Empire) from 1850 to 1860. Its administrative center was Neusatz (Serbian: Novi Sad).

History
The crown land Voivodeship of Serbia and Banat of Temeschwar was formed in 1849 and was initially divided into two districts: Batschka-Torontal and Temeschwar-Karasch. In 1850, crown land was divided into five districts and the territory of Batschka-Torontal District was divided among Neusatz District, Zombor District and Großbetschkerek District.

In 1860, the Voivodeship of Serbia and Banat of Temeschwar and its five districts were abolished and the territory of the Neusatz District was divided among Batsch-Bodrog County (part of the Kingdom of Hungary) and Syrmia County (part of the Austrian Kingdom of Slavonia).

Geography
The Neusatz District included parts of southern Bačka and northern Syrmia. It shared borders with the Zombor District in the north, Großbetschkerek District in the north-east, Military Frontier in the south-east and Austrian Kingdom of Slavonia in the west.

Demographics
According to 1850 census, the population of the district numbered 236,943 residents, including:
Serbs = 100,382 (42.37%)
Germans = 45,936 (19.39%)
Hungarians = 30,450 (12.85%)
Slovaks = 20,683 (8.73%)
Šokci = 13,665 (5.77%)
Jews = 2,098 (0.89%)

Cities and towns
Main cities and towns in the district were:
Alt Betsche (Stari Bečej)
Batsch (Bač)
Futok (Futog)
Hodschach (Odžaci)
Illok (Ilok)
India (Inđija)
Irick (Irig)
Neusatz (Novi Sad)
Plankenburg (Palanka)
Ruma (Ruma)
Schid (Šid)
Temeri (Temerin)
Thomasberg (Sentomaš)

Most of the mentioned cities and towns are today in Serbia, while town of Illok (Ilok) is today in Croatia.

See also
History of Novi Sad
Voivodeship of Serbia and Banat of Temeschwar

References

Further reading
Dr Saša Kicošev - Dr Drago Njegovan, Razvoj etničke i verske strukture Vojvodine, Novi Sad, 2010.
Dr Drago Njegovan, Prisajedinjenje Vojvodine Srbiji, Novi Sad, 2004.

External links
Map of the District
Map of the District
Map of the District

History of Novi Sad
History of Bačka
History of Syrmia
Voivodeship of Serbia and Banat of Temeschwar